Monticello School District 18  is a school district based in Monticello, Arkansas, United States. It serves almost all of the Monticello city limits.

Schools 
 Monticello Elementary School, serving prekindergarten through grade 2.
 Monticello Intermediate School, serving grades 3 through 5.
 Monticello Middle School, serving grades 6 through 8.
 Monticello High School, serving grades 9 through 12.
 Monticello Vocational Center, serving grades 9 through 12.

References

External links
 

Monticello, Arkansas
Education in Drew County, Arkansas
School districts in Arkansas